Fusi is a brand of motorcycles.

Fusi may also refer to:

Places 
Fusi, Samoa, a village
Alcara li Fusi, a comune in Sicily, Italy
Fusi Mountain in the People's Republic of China

Other uses 
 Fusi (name)
 Fusi (pasta), a type of pasta
 Virgin Mountain, a 2015 Icelandic film

See also
Fuzi, a fly-whisk used as a symbol in Buddhism and Taoism